Obor-knez was a title borne by elected local native Serbian chiefs (Knyaz) of the nahiyah (district of a group of villages) in the Ottoman Sanjak of Smederevo (also known as the Pashalik of Belgrade). The obor-knez was senior chief and responsible for his district's people and was their spokesman (intermediary) in direct relations with the Pasha, though usually through the sipahi, and was in charge of the transfer of taxes levied on the villages. The vojvoda and obor-knez titles were given to people approved by the Pasha. The title was hereditary, being succeeded by one's son. The obor-knez, as a senior, had several knezes under him, who held sub-districts or one village each.

History
In 1788, Koča's frontier rebellion saw eastern Šumadija occupied by Austrian Serbian freikorps and hajduks. The Siege of Belgrade from 15 September to 8 October 1789, a Habsburg Austrian force besieged the fortress of Belgrade. The Austrians held the city until 1791 when it handed Belgrade back to the Ottomans according to the terms of the Treaty of Sistova.

In 1793 and 1796 Sultan Selim III proclaimed firmans which gave more rights to Serbs. Among other things, taxes were to be collected by the obor-knez; freedom of trade and religion were granted and there was peace. Selim III also decreed that some unpopular janissaries were to leave the Belgrade Pashaluk as he saw them as a threat to the central authority of Hadži Mustafa Pasha. Many of those janissaries were employed by or found refuge with Osman Pazvantoğlu, a renegade opponent of Sultan Selim III in the Sanjak of Vidin. Fearing the dissolution of the Janissary command in Sanjak of Smederevo, Osman Pazvantoğlu launched a series of raids against Serbians without the permission of Sultan Selim III, causing much volatility and fear in the region. Pazvantoğlu was defeated in 1793 by the Serbs at the Battle of Kolari. In the summer of 1797 the sultan appointed Mustafa Pasha on position of beglerbeg of Rumelia Eyalet and he left Serbia for Plovdiv to fight against the Vidin rebels of Pazvantoğlu. During the absence of Mustafa Pasha, the forces of Pazvantoğlu captured Požarevac and besieged the Belgrade fortress. At the end of November 1797 obor-knezes Aleksa Nenadović, Ilija Birčanin and Nikola Grbović from Valjevo brought their forces to Belgrade and forced the besieging janissary forces to retreat to Smederevo. By 1799 the janissary corps had returned, as they were pardoned by Sultan's decree, and they immediately suspended the Serbian autonomy and drastically increased taxes, enforcing martial law in Serbia. On 15 December 1801 Hadži Mustafa Pasha, the Vizier of Belgrade Pashaluk was killed by Kuchuk Alija, one of four dahiyas (renegade jannissary leaders). This resulted in the Sanjak of Smederevo being ruled by these renegade janissaries independently from the Ottoman government. Several district chiefs were murdered in the Slaughter of the Knezes on 4 February 1804, by the renegade janissaries. This sparked the First Serbian Uprising (1804–13), the first phase of the Serbian Revolution. The title continued its use by the Serbian revolutionary government. The knežina (кнежина) has a modern equivalent of municipality, as the sizes of the knežine were close to modern municipalities.

List

See also
Kodjabashis
Obor-kapetan

Annotations
It was less commonly spelt ober-knez (обер-кнез). It is derived from German ober ("upper"), and Slavic knez ("duke"). The Turkish equivalent, sometimes used, was baš-knez (баш-кнез, "head knez").

References

Sources

Ottoman Serbia
Ottoman titles
Titles in Serbia
18th century in Serbia
Serbia under Habsburg rule